Maredumilli is a village in Maredumilli Mandal in Alluri Sitharama Raju district in the state of Andhra Pradesh in India. It is 90 km from Rajahmundry city. It has many waterfalls and beautiful locations. Over the years, it has become a popular location for various films and television shows.

References 

Villages in East Godavari district